Mamdi is one of two departments in Lac, a region of Chad. Its capital is Bol.

Departments of Chad
Lac Region